Jos Haex (born 19 August 1959) is a former Belgian racing cyclist. He rode in five editions of the Tour de France between 1986 and 1990.

References

External links

1959 births
Living people
Belgian male cyclists
Cyclists from Limburg (Belgium)
People from Meeuwen-Gruitrode